Adil Akram (born 6 May 1992) is a Pakistani cricketer. He made his first-class debut for Sui Northern Gas Pipelines Limited in the 2016–17 Quaid-e-Azam Trophy on 7 October 2016.

References

External links
 

1992 births
Living people
Pakistani cricketers
Sui Northern Gas Pipelines Limited cricketers
Cricketers from Lahore